Namik is a masculine given name. It may also refer to:

 Namik Glacier, situated in the Pithoragarh district of Uttarakhand state of India
 Namık Kemal Dungeon, historical building in Famagusta, Cyprus
 Namık Kemal House Museum, Tekirdağ, museum in Turkey
 Namık Kemal University, university in Tekirdağ, Turkey
 Famagusta Namık Kemal High School, school in Cyprus
 İzmir Namık Kemal Lisesi, historical high school in İzmir, Turkey
 Kızılpınar Namık Kemal, Çerkezköy, neighborhood in Çerkezköy, Tekirdağ